Lorry Driver Rajakannu is a 1981 Indian Tamil-language film, directed by A. C. Tirulokchandar. The film stars Sivaji Ganesan and Sripriya. It is a remake of the Telugu film Driver Ramudu. The film was released on 3 July 1981.

Plot 

Rajakannu is a lorry driver whose only family is his blind sister, Meena. He always stands up for what's right and goes out of his way to assist others. He helps fellow driver Ramu and earns a devoted friend. Rajakannu falls for the short-tempered food stall owner Kannamma. Meena also becomes engaged to marry inspector Shankar. In the midst of this, Rajakannu is arrested after being implicated in a smuggling ring run by Jaganath and his son Kamal. With the help of Ramu, Kanamma and his lorry cleaner Periyathambi, he attempts to clear his name and bring the true criminals to justice.

Cast 
Sivaji Ganesan as Rajakannu
Sripriya as Kannamma
M. N. Nambiar as Jaganath
Major Sundararajan as Ramu
Sathyakala as Meena
Suruli Rajan as Periyathambi
Jai Ganesh as Shankar
Kanchana as Seetha
Manorama as Paapa
Jayamalini
Ceylon Manohar
Prem Anand as Kamal
Haalam

Soundtrack 
Soundtrack was composed by M. S. Viswanathan.

Reception 
Sindhu and Jeeva, reviewing for Kalki, criticised the film for being formulaic and lacking newness.

References

External links 
 

1980s Tamil-language films
1981 films
Films directed by A. C. Tirulokchandar
Films scored by M. S. Viswanathan
Tamil remakes of Telugu films
Trucker films